Limb body wall complex (LBWC) is a rare fetal malformation of unknown origins.

Traditionally diagnosis has been based on the Van Allen et al., criteria, i.e. the presence of two out of three of the following anomalies:
 Exencephaly or encephalocele with facial clefts
 Thoraco and/or abdominoschisis and
 Limb defects.

LBWC occurs in approximately 0.32 in 100,000 births.

At this time, there is no known cause of Limb Body Wall Complex. However, there have been tentative links made between a diagnosis of LBWC and cocaine use. In addition, current research has shown that there may be a genetic cause for a small limited number of LBWC cases.

Limb Body Wall Complex is a lethal birth defect. There are only anecdotal stories of survivors.

References 

Congenital disorders of musculoskeletal system
Rare diseases
Embryology